Thomsun Group is a Dubai, UAE-based diverse conglomerate. It was established in 1976 by its founders K V Thomas and V T John. The group is headquartered in Dubai and has its business interests across the Gulf countries and the Indian subcontinent.

History

The group started its operations in 1976 and since then has ventured into many business ventures.

In 1980, the group began its journey in the print and packaging industry as Al Mawrid Printing and Advertising.

By 1989, they extended their business to the seafood business with the inauguration of East Fish Co.

In 1990, their trading establishment became the authorised distributor of the complete range of Yamaha musical and audio products in the UAE.
Currently, the group runs over 20 business segments in GCC and India with a team of around 3,000 people and has a complete turnover of $600 million. Some of these core segments include education, printing, packaging, digital signage solutions, logistics, musical instruments distribution, electronics distribution, supermarkets, and electrical & mechanical products manufacturing.

Divisions

Pre Press and Digital Prints
Printing and Publishing
Electronics and Distribution
Food processing units
Bakery and Confectionary
Supermarket
Electro-mechanical
Education
Healthcare
Logistics
Furniture
Facility Management

References 

Companies based in Dubai
Investment companies of the United Arab Emirates
1976 establishments in the United Arab Emirates
Retail companies of the United Arab Emirates